Timothy (Tim) Mark Wallace (born 29 March 1969, in Sydney) is a former rugby union player who played with the Australian national team and NSW Waratahs.

Wallace played two tests for Australia as fly half against Italy in 1994, scoring 20 points.

References

1969 births
Living people
Australian rugby union players
Australia international rugby union players
People educated at Barker College
Rugby union fly-halves
Rugby union players from Sydney